The Montenegro men's national volleyball team represents Montenegro in international men's volleyball competitions and friendly matches. The national volleyball team was formed in 2006, recently after independence. Montenegro is a full member of FIVB and CEV since 2006.
Montenegro played their first official match at 1 September 2007 in Podgorica and won against Latvia (3-1).
Until now, at major tournaments, Montenegro played in FIVB World League and European League. Montenegro made main success at 2014, winning the gold medal in European League.

List of official matches
Below is a list of all official matches (under the FIVB/CEV) played by the national team since Montenegrin independence.

 WCQ - World Championship qualifiers; ECQ - European Championship qualifiers; OGQ - Olympic Games qualifiers; GSS - Games of the Small States of Europe

Montenegro vs. other countries 
Below is the list of performances of Montenegro women's national volleyball team against every single opponent.

* Statistics correct as of end 2021 European Volleyball Championship.

See also
 Montenegro men's national volleyball team
 Volleyball Federation of Montenegro (OSCG)
 Montenegrin Volleyball League

References

National men's volleyball teams
Volleyball in Montenegro
Men's sport in Montenegro